Optivus is a fish genus from the family Trachichthyidae found from near the surface to depths of  in the southwest Pacific Ocean off Australia (O. agastos and O. agrammus) and New Zealand (O. elongatus).

Species
The currently recognized species in this genus are:
 Optivus agastos M. F. Gomon, 2004 (violet roughy)
 Optivus agrammus M. F. Gomon, 2004 (western roughy)
 Optivus elongatus (Günther, 1859) (slender roughy)

References

External links
 

 
Marine fish genera
Taxa named by Gilbert Percy Whitley